Journey to Anywhere is the first full-length studio recording by Long Beach, California, hip hop group Ugly Duckling.

Track listing 
"Introduckling" – 3:30
"I Did it Like This" – 3:12
"Journey to Anywhere" – 4:31
"Friday Night" – 3:19
"A Little Samba" – 3:20
"The Pike" – 2:10
"If You Wanna Know" – 3:54
"Eye on the Gold Chain" – 3:16
"Pickup Lines" – 3:14
"Rock on Top" – 3:48
"Oasis" – 3:33
"Dizzy" – 2:18
"Down the Road" – 3:59
"Lay it on Ya" – 3:21
"Visions" (Bonus Track) – 3:46

References

2001 debut albums
Ugly Duckling (hip hop group) albums
Emperor Norton Records albums